Triplophysa tibetana is a species of stone loach in the genus Triplophysa. It is endemic to the upper Brahmaputra and upper Indus rivers in Tibet. It lives in slower flowing, shallow areas in lakes and rivers with ample aquatic vegetation. It grows to  SL.

References

T
Endemic fauna of Tibet
Freshwater fish of China
Fish described in 1905
Taxa named by Charles Tate Regan